The Year’s Best Horror Stories was a series of annual anthologies published by DAW Books in the U.S. from 1972 to 1994 under the successive editorships of Richard Davis from 1972 to 1975 (after a 1971-1973 series published by Sphere Books in the U.K.; the first volumes had the same contents, the U.S. second volume in 1974 drew stories from the second and third U.K. volumes, and the 1975 U.S. third volume was very different from the U.K's.; the U.S. third volume was published as a one-shot volume in the U.K. by Orbit Books in 1976), and of Gerald W. Page from 1976 to 1979, and Karl Edward Wagner from 1980 to 1994. The series was discontinued after Wagner's death. It was a companion to DAW’s The Annual World’s Best SF and The Year's Best Fantasy Stories, which performed a similar function for the science fiction and fantasy fields.

Each annual volume reprinted what in the opinion of the editor was the best horror short fiction appearing in the previous year. The series also aimed to discover and nurture new talent. It featured both occasionally recurring authors and writers new to the horror genre. Veterans among the contributing authors included Brian Lumley, Eddy C. Bertin, Kit Reed, R. Chetwynd-Hayes, Ramsey Campbell, Dennis Etchison, Richard Matheson, Robert Bloch, and Tanith Lee; some of the relative newcomers to the field featured were Stephen King, Al Sarrantonio, Lisa Tuttle, Jessica Amanda Salmonson, David Drake, Juleen Brantingham, and Nina Kiriki Hoffman.

The series

Volumes edited by Richard Davis
1. The Year’s Best Horror Stories, editor Richard Davis, Sphere Books (UK) 1971; DAW Books (US) 1972

Double Lamby (1970), by Robert Bloch
The Sinister City (1969), by Brian Lumley
When Morning Cums (1969), by Elizabeth Fancett
Pray (1969), by Richard Matheson
Winner (1969), by Kit Reed
Lucifer Morningstar (1969), by E. C. Tubb
I Wonder What He Wants Now (1971), by Eddy C. Bertin
Problem Child (1970), by Peter Oldale
The Scarf (1969), by Ramsey Campbell
Time Warp (1968), by Ralph Norton
The Hate (1971), by Terri E. Pinckard
A Quiet Game (1970), by Celia Fremlin
After Nightfall (1970), by David A. Riley
Death's Door (1969), by Robert McNear

2 (UK).  The Year’s Best Horror Stories II, editor Richard Davis, Sphere Books (UK) 1972.

Foreword by Christopher Lee
Thirst (1972), by Gerald W. Page
David's Worm (1971), by Brian Lumley
The Price of a Demon (1972), by Gary Brandner
The Knocker at the Portico (1971), by Basil Copper
The Throwaway Man (1970), by Stepan Chapman [as by Steve Chapman ]
The Woman With the Mauve Face (1972), by Rosemary Timperley
The Shadows of the Living (1970), by Ronald Blythe
The Animal Fair (1971), by Robert Bloch
Napier Court (1971), by Ramsey Campbell
Haunts of the Very Rich (1971) by T. K. Brown, III

3 (UK).  The Year’s Best Horror Stories III, editor Richard Davis, Sphere Books (UK) 1973.

Pages from a Young Girl's Journal (1973), by Robert Aickman
The Long-Term Residents (1971), by Kit Pedler
The Mirror from Antiquity (1972), by Susanna Bates
Like Two White Spiders (1973), by Eddy C. Bertin (trans. of Als Twee Grote Witte Spinnen 1971)
The Old Horns (1973), by Ramsey Campbell
Haggopian (1973), by Brian Lumley
The Recompensing of Albano Pizar (1973), by Basil Copper
Were-Creature  (1971), by Kenneth Pemrooke
The Events at Poroth Farm (1972), by T. E. D. Klein

2 (US). The Year’s Best Horror Stories: Series II, editor Richard Davis, DAW Books (US) 1974

Foreword by Christopher Lee
David's Worm (1971), by Brian Lumley
The Price of a Demon (1972), by Gary Brandner
The Knocker at the Portico (1971), by Basil Copper
The Animal Fair (1971), by Robert Bloch
Napier Court (1971), by Ramsey Campbell
Haunts of the Very Rich (1971) by T. K. Brown, III
The Long-Term Residents (1971), by Kit Pedler
Like Two White Spiders (1973), by Eddy C. Bertin (trans. of Als Twee Grote Witte Spinnen 1971)
The Old Horns (1973), by Ramsey Campbell
Haggopian (1973), by Brian Lumley
The Events at Poroth Farm (1972), by T. E. D. Klein

3 (US).   The Year’s Best Horror Stories: Series III, editor Richard Davis, DAW Books (US) 1975; Orbit Books (UK) 1976 as The First Orbit Book of Horror Stories

The Whimper of Whipped Dogs (1973), by Harlan Ellison
The Man in the Underpass (1975), by Ramsey Campbell
S.F. (1975), by T. E. D. Klein
Uncle Vlad (1973), by Clive Sinclair
Judas Story (1975), by Brian Stableford
The House of Cthulhu (1973), by Brian Lumley
Satanesque (1974), by Allan Weiss
Burger Creature (1973) by Stepan Chapman [as by Steve Chapman]
Wake Up Dead (1975), by Tim Stout
Forget-Me-Not (1975), by Bernard Taylor
Halloween Story  (1972), by Gregory Fitz Gerald
Big, Wide, Wonderful World (1958), by Charles E. Fritch
The Taste of Your Love (1971), by Eddy C. Bertin (trans. of De Smaak van Jouw Liefde 1971)

Volumes edited by Gerald W. Page
4.	The Year’s Best Horror Stories IV, editor Gerald W. Page, 1976.
Forever Stand The Stones (1975), by Joseph F. Pumilia
And Don't Forget the One Red Rose (1975), by Avram Davidson
Christmas Present (1975), by Ramsey Campbell
A Question of Guilt (1976), by Hal Clement
The House on Stillcroft Street (1975), by Joseph Payne Brennan
The Recrudescence of Geoffrey Marvell (1976), by G. N. Gabbard
Something Had to Be Done (1975), by David Drake
Cottage Tenant (1975), by Frank Belknap Long
The Man with the Aura (1974), by R. A. Lafferty
White Wolf Calling (1975), by Charles L. Grant
Lifeguard (1975), by Arthur Byron Cover
The Black Captain (1975), by H. Warner Munn
The Glove (1975), by Fritz Leiber
No Way Home (1975), by Brian Lumley
The Lovecraft Controversy-Why? (1976) essay by E. Hoffmann Price

5.	The Year’s Best Horror Stories V, editor Gerald W. Page, 1977.
The Service (1976), by Jerry Sohl
Long Hollow Swamp (1976), by Joseph Payne Brennan
Sing a Last Song of Valdese (1976), by Karl Edward Wagner
Harold's Blues (1976), by Glen Singer
The Well (1977), by H. Warner Munn
A Most Unusual Murder (1976), by Robert Bloch
Huzdra (1977), by Tanith Lee
Shatterday (1975), by Harlan Ellison
Children of the Forest (1976), by David Drake
The Day It Rained Lizards (1977), by Arthur Byron Cover
Followers of the Dark Star (1976), by Robert Edmond Alter
When All the Children Call My Name (1977), by Charles L. Grant
Belsen Express (1975), by Fritz Leiber 
Where the Woodbine Twineth (1976), by Manly Wade Wellman

6.	The Year’s Best Horror Stories VI, editor Gerald W. Page, 1978.
At the Bottom of the Garden (1975), by David Campton
Screaming to Get Out (1977), by Janet Fox
Undertow (1977), by Karl Edward Wagner
I Can Hear the Dark (1978), by Dennis Etchison
Ever the Faith Endures (1978), by Manly Wade Wellman
The Horse Lord (1977), by Lisa Tuttle
Winter White (1978), by Tanith Lee
A Cobweb of Pulsing Veins (1977), by William Scott Home
Best of Luck, (1978), by David Drake
Children of the Corn (1977), by Stephen King
If Damon Comes (1978), by Charles L. Grant
Drawing In (1978), by Ramsey Campbell
Within the Walls of Tyre (1978), by Michael Bishop
There's a Long, Long Trail A-Winding (1976), by Russell Kirk

7.	The Year’s Best Horror Stories VII, editor Gerald W. Page, 1979.
The Pitch (1978), by Dennis Etchison
The Night of the Tiger (1978), by Stephen King
Amma (1978), by Charles R. Saunders
Chastel (1979), by Manly Wade Wellman
Sleeping Tiger (1978), by Tanith Lee
Intimately, With Rain (1978), by Janet Fox
The Secret (1966), by Jack Vance
Hear Me Now, My Sweet Abbey Rose (1978), by Charles L. Grant
Divers Hands (1979), by Darrell Schweitzer
Heading Home (1978), by Ramsey Campbell
In the Arcade (1978), by Lisa Tuttle
Nemesis Place (1978), by David Drake
Collaborating (1978), by Michael Bishop
Marriage (1977), by Robert Aickman

Volumes edited by Karl Edward Wagner
8.	The Year’s Best Horror Stories VIII, editor Karl Edward Wagner, 1980.
The Dead Line (1979), by Dennis Etchison
To Wake the Dead (1979), by Ramsey Campbell
In the Fourth Year of the War (1979), by Harlan Ellison
From the Lower Deep (1979), by Hugh B. Cave
The Baby-Sitter (1978), by Davis Grubb
The Well at the Half Cat (1979), by John Tibbets
My Beautiful Darkling (1979), by Eddy C. Bertin
A Serious Call (1979), by George Hay
Sheets (1979), by Alan Ryan
Billy Wolfe's Riding Spirit (1979), by Kevin A. Lyons
Lex Talionis (1979), by Russell Kirk
Entombed (1979), by Robert Keefe
A Fly One (1979), by Steve Sneyd
Needle Song (1979), by Charles L. Grant
All the Birds Come Home to Roost (1979), by Harlan Ellison
The Devil Behind You (1979), by Richard A. Moore

9.	The Year’s Best Horror Stories IX, editor Karl Edward Wagner, 1981.
 The Monkey (1980), by Stephen King
 The Gap (1980), by Ramsey Campbell
 The Cats of Pere Lachaise (1980), by Neil Olonoff
 The Propert Bequest (1980), by Basil A. Smith
 On Call (1980), by Dennis Etchison
 The Catacomb (1980), by Peter Shilston
 Black Man with a Horn (1980), by T.E.D. Klein
 The King (1980), by William Relling Jr.
 Footsteps (1980), by Harlan Ellison
 Without Rhyme or Reason (1980), by Peter Valentine Timlett

10.	The Year’s Best Horror Stories X, editor Karl Edward Wagner, 1982
 Through the Walls (1978), by Ramsey Campbell 
 Touring (1981), by Gardner Dozois, Jack Dann, and Michael Swanwick
 Every Time You Say I Love You (1981), by Charles L. Grant
 Wyntours (1980), by David G. Rowlands
 The Dark Country (1981), by Dennis Etchison
 Homecoming (1981), by Howard Goldsmith
 Old Hobby Horse (1981), by A. F. Kidd
 Firstborn (1981), by David Campton
 Luna (1981), by G. W. Perriwils
 Mind (1980), by Les Freeman
 Competition (1981), by David Clayton Carrad 
 Egnaro (1981), by M. John Harrison
 On 202 (1981), by Jeff Hecht
 The Trick (1980), by Ramsey Campbell
 Broken Glass (1981), by Harlan Ellison

11.	The Year’s Best Horror Stories XI, editor Karl Edward Wagner, 1983.
The Grab (1982), by Richard Laymon
The Show Goes On (1982), by Ramsey Campbell
The House at Evening (1982), by Frances Garfield
I Hae Dream'd a Dreary Dream (1981), by John Alfred Taylor
Deathtracks (1982), by Dennis Etchison
Come, Follow! (1982), by Sheila Hodgson
The Smell of Cherries (1982), by Jeffrey Goddin
A Posthumous Bequest (1982), by David Campton
Slippage (1982), by Michael P. Kube-McDowell
The Executor (1982), by David G. Rowlands
Mrs. Halfbooger's Basement (1982), by Lawrence C. Connolly
Rouse Him Not (1982), by Manly Wade Wellman
Spare the Child (1982), by Thomas F. Monteleone 
The New Rays (1982), by M. John Harrison
Cruising (1982), by Donald Tyson
The Depths (1982), by Ramsey Campbell
Pumpkin Head (1982), by Al Sarrantonio

12.	The Year’s Best Horror Stories XII, editor Karl Edward Wagner, 1984.
Uncle Otto's Truck (1983), by Stephen King
3.47 AM (1983), by David Langford
Mistral (1983), by Jon Wynne-Tyson
Out of Africa (1983), by David Drake
The Wall-Painting (1983), by Roger Johnson
Keepsake (1983), by Vincent McHardy
Echoes (1983), by Lawrence C. Connolly
After-Images (1983), by Malcolm Edwards
The Ventriloquist's Daughter (1983), by Juleen Brantingham
Come to the Party (1983), by Frances Garfield
The Chair (1983), by Dennis Etchison
Names (1983), by Jane Yolen
The Attic (1983), by Billy Wolfenbarger
Just Waiting (1983), by Ramsey Campbell
One for the Horrors (1983), by David J. Schow
Elle Est Trois, (La Mort) (1983), by Tanith Lee
Spring-Fingered Jack (1983), by Susan Casper
The Flash! Kid (1983), by Scott Bradfield
The Man with Legs (1983), by Al Sarrantonio

13.	The Year’s Best Horror Stories XIII, editor Karl Edward Wagner, 1985.
Mrs. Todd's Shortcut (1984), by Stephen King
Are You Afraid of the Dark? (1984), by Charles L. Grant
Catch Your Death (1984), by John Gordon
Dinner Party (1984), by Gardner Dozois
Tiger in the Snow (1984), by Daniel Wynn Barber
Watch the Birdie (1984), by Ramsey Campbell
Coming Soon to a Theatre Near You (1984), by David J. Schow
Hands with Long Fingers (1984), by Leslie Halliwell
Weird Tales (1984), by Fred Chappell
The Wardrobe (1984), by Jovan Panich
Angst for the Memories (1984), by Vincent McHardy
The Thing in the Bedroom (1984), by David Langford
Borderland (1984), by John Brizzolara 
The Scarecrow (1984), by Roger Johnson
The End of the World (1984), by James B. Hemesath
Never Grow Up (1984), by John Gordon
Deadlights (1984), by Charles Wagner
Talking in the Dark (1984), by Dennis Etchison

14.	The Year’s Best Horror Stories XIV, editor Karl Edward Wagner, 1986.
Penny Daye (1985), by Charles L. Grant
Dwindling (1985), by David B. Silva
Dead Men's Fingers (1985), by Phillip C. Heath
Dead Week (1985), by Leonard Carpenter
The Sneering (1985), by Ramsey Campbell
Bunny Didn't Tell Us (1985), by David J. Schow
Pinewood (1984), by Tanith Lee
The Night People (1985), by Michael Reaves
Ceremony (1985), by William F. Nolan
The Women in Black (1984), by Dennis Etchison
...Beside the Seaside, Beside the Sea... (1985), by Simon Clark
Mother's Day (1985), by Stephen F. Wilcox
Lava Tears (1985), by Vincent McHardy
Rapid Transit (1985), by Wayne Allen Sallee
The Weight of Zero (1985), by John Alfred Taylor
John's Return to Liverpool (1984), by Christopher Burns
In Late December, Before the Storm (1985), by Paul M. Sammon
Red Christmas (1985), by David Garnett
Too Far Behind Gradina (1985), by Steve Sneyd

15.	The Year’s Best Horror Stories XV, editor Karl Edward Wagner, 1987.
 The Yougoslaves (1986), by Robert Bloch 
 Tight Little Stitches in a Dead Man’s Back (1986), by Joe R. Lansdale
 Apples (1986), by Ramsey Campbell
 Dead White Women (1986), by William F. Wu
 Crystal (1986), by Charles L. Grant
 Retirement (1986), by Ron Leming
 The Man Who Did Tricks With Glass (1986), by Ron Wolfe
 Bird in a Wrought Iron Cage (1986), by John Alfred Taylor
 The Olympic Runner (1986), by Dennis Etchison
 Take the “A” Train (1986), by Wayne Allen Sallee
 The Foggy, Foggy Dew (1986), by Joel Lane
 The Godmother (1986), by Tina Rath 
 "Pale, Trembling Youth" (1986), by W. H. Pugmire & Jessica Amanda Salmonson
 Red Light (1986), by David J. Schow
 In the Hour Before Dawn (1986), by Brad Strickland
 Necros (1986), by Brian Lumley
 Tattoos (1986), by Jack M. Dann
 Acquiring a Family (1986), by R. Chetwynd-Hayes
 
16.	The Year’s Best Horror Stories XVI, editor Karl Edward Wagner, 1988.
  Popsy (1987), by Stephen King
 Neighbourhood Watch (1987), by Greg Egan
 Wolf/Child (1987), by Jane Yolen
 Everything to Live For (1987), by Charles L. Grant
 Repossession (1987), by David Campton
 Merry May (1987), by Ramsey Campbell
 The Touch (1987), by Wayne Allen Sallee
 Moving Day (1987), by R. Chetwynd-Hayes
 La Nuit des Chiens (1987), by Leslie Halliwell
 Echoes from the Abbey (1987), by Sheila Hodgson
 Visitors (1987), by Jack Dann
 The Bellfounder’s Wife (1987), by A. F. Kidd
 The Scar (1987), by Dennis Etchison
 Martyr Without Canon (1987), by T. Winter-Damon
 The Thin People (1987), by Brian Lumley
 Fat Face (1987), by Michael Shea

17.	The Year’s Best Horror Stories XVII, editor Karl Edward Wagner, 1989.
 Fruiting Bodies (1988), by Brian Lumley
 Works of Art (1988), by Nina Kiriki Hoffman
 She’s a Young Thing and Cannot Leave Her Mother (1988), by Harlan Ellison
 The Resurrection Man (1988), by Ian Watson
 Now and Again in Summer (1988), by Charles L. Grant
 Call 666 (1988), by Dennis Etchison
 The Great God Pan (1988), by M. John Harrison
 What Dreams May Come (1988), by Brad Strickland
 Regression (1988), by R. Chetwynd-Hayes
 Souvenirs from a Damnation (1988), by Don Webb
 Bleeding Between the Lines (1988), by Wayne Allen Sallee
 Playing the Game (1988), by Ramsey Campbell
 Lost Bodies (1988), by Ian Watson
 Ours Now (1988), by Nicholas Royle
 Prince of Flowers (1988), by Elizabeth Hand
 The Daily Chernobyl (1988), by Robert Frazier
 Snowman (1988), by Charles L. Grant
 Nobody’s Perfect (1988),  by Thomas F. Monteleone
 Dead Air (1988), by Gregory Nicoll
 Recrudescence (1988), by Leonard Carpenter

18.	The Year’s Best Horror Stories XVIII, editor Karl Edward Wagner, 1990.
Kaddish (1989), by Jack Dann
The Gravedigger's Tale (1989), by Simon Clark
Meeting the Author (1989), by Ramsey Campbell
Buckets (1989), by F. Paul Wilson
The Pit-Yakker (1989), by Brian Lumley
Mr. Sandman (1989), by Scott D. Yost
Renaissance (1989), by Chico Kidd
Lord of Infinite Diversions (1989), by T. Winter-Damon
Rail Rider (1989), by Wayne Allen Sallee
Archway (1989), by Nicholas Royle
The Confessional (1989), by Patrick McLeod
The Deliverer (1989), by Simon MacCulloch
Reflections (1989), by Jeffrey Goddin
Zombies for Jesus (1989), by Nina Kiriki Hoffman
The Earth Wire (1989), by Joel Lane
Sponge and China Tea (1989), by D. F. Lewis
The Boy With the Bloodstained Mouth (1989), by W. H. Pugmire
On the Dark Road (1989), by Ian McDowell
Narcopolis (1989), by Wayne Allen Sallee
Nights in the City (1989), by Jessica Amanda Salmonson
Return to the Mutant Rain Forest (1989), by Bruce Boston and Robert Frazier
The End of the Hunt (1989), by David Drake
The Motivation (1989), by David Langford
The Guide (1989), by Ramsey Campbell
The Horse of Iron & How We Can Know It & Be Changed By It Forever (1989), by M. John Harrison
Jerry's Kids Meet Wormboy (1989), by David J. Schow

19.	The Year’s Best Horror Stories XIX, editor Karl Edward Wagner, 1991.
Speed Demons (1990), by Andrew J. Wilson
The Grief Condition (1990), by Conrad Hill
Firebird (1990), by J. L. Comeau
Life Sentences (1990), by Nina Kiriki Hoffman
Trophies (1990), by Richard McMahan
Lord of the Creepies (1990), by Sean Brodrick
Mongrel (1990), by Steve Vernon
The Man Who Collected Barker (1990), by Kim Newman 
Hide and Seek (1990), by D. F. Lewis
Walking After Midnight (1990), by C. S. Fuqua
The Hermit (1990), by Joey Froehlich 
The Soldier (1990), by Roger Johnson
Books of Blurbs, Vol. 1 (1990), by Mike Newland
You're a Sick Man, Mr. Antwhistle (1990), by Robert Hood
Elfin Pipes of Northworld (1990), by David Drake
A Bar Called Charley's (1990), by Charles Ardai
Great Expectations (1990), by Kim Antieau
Custer at the Wheel (1990), by James B. Hemesath
Identity Crisis (1990), by Patrick McLeod
Negatives (1990), by Nicholas Royle
A Candle in the Sun (1990), by David Niall Wilson 
The Worst Fog of the Year (1990), by Ramsey Campbell
I'll Give You Half-Scairt (1990), by Wayne Allen Sallee 
Different Kinds of Dead, (1990), by Ed Gorman
Full Throttle (1990), by Philip Nutman

20.	The Year’s Best Horror Stories XX, editor Karl Edward Wagner, 1992.
Ma Qui (1991), by Alan Brennert
The Same in Any Language (1991), by Ramsey Campbell
Call Home (1991), by Dennis Etchison
A Scent of Roses (1991), by Jeffrey Goddin
Root Cellar (1991), by Nancy Kilpatrick
An Eye for an Eye (1991), by Michael A. Arnzen
The Picnickers (1991), by Brian Lumley
With the Wound Still Wet (1991), by Wayne Allen Sallee
My Giddy Aunt (1991), by D. F. Lewis
The Lodestone (1991), by Sheila Hodgson
Baseball Memories (1991), by Edo van Belkom
The Bacchae (1991), by Elizabeth Hand
Common Land (1991), by Joel Lane
An Invasion of Angels (1987), by Nina Kiriki Hoffman
The Sharps and Flats Guarantee (1991), by C. S. Fuqua
Medusa's Child (1991), by Kim Antieau
Wall of Masks (1991), by T. Winter-Damon
Moving Out (1991), by Nicholas Royle
Better Ways in a Wet Alley (1991), by Barb Hendee
Close to the Earth (1991), by Gregory Nicoll
Churches of Desire (1991), by Philip Nutman
Carven of Onyx (1991), by Ron Weighell

21.	The Year’s Best Horror Stories XXI, editor Karl Edward Wagner, 1993.
The Limits of Fantasy (1992), by Ramsey Campbell
China Rose (1992), by Ron Weighell
The Outsider (1992), by Rick Kennett
Briar Rose (1992), by Kim Antieau
Mom SchooL (1992), by Rand Soellner
The Hyacinth Girl (1992), by Mary Ann Mitchell
Mind Games (1992), by Adam Meyer
Mama's Boy (1992), by C. S. Fuqua
The Shabbie People (1992), by Jeffrey Osier
The Ugly File (1992), by Ed Gorman
Eyes Like a Ghost's (1992), by Simon Clark
Fallen Idol (1992), by Lillian Csernica
And Some Are Missing (1992), by Joel Lane
Welsh Pepper (1992), by D. F. Lewis
Tracks (1992), by Nicholas Royle
Largesse (1992), by Mark McLaughlin
City in the Torrid Waste (1992), by T. Winter-Damon
Haunting Me Softly (1992), by H. Andrew Lynch
Spring Ahead, Fall Back (1992), by Michael A. Arnzen
Apotheosis (1992), by Carrie Richerson
Defining the Commonplace Sliver (1992), by Wayne Allen Sallee
Feeding the Masses (1992), by Yvonne Navarro
Sanctuary (1992), by Jeffrey Osier
The Devil's Advocate (1991), by Andrew C. Ferguson
Week Woman (1992), by Kim Newman
A Father's Gift (1992), by W. M. Shockley

22.	The Year’s Best Horror Stories XXII, editor Karl Edward Wagner, 1994.
 The Ripper’s Tune (1993), by Gregory Nicoll
 One Size Eats All (1993), by T.E.D. Klein
 Resurrection (1991), by Adam Meyer
 I Live to Wash Her (1993), by Joey Froehlich
 A Little-Known Side of Elvis (1993), by Dennis Etchison
 Perfect Days (1993), by Chet Williamson
 See How They Run (1993), by Ramsey Campbell
 Shots Downed, Officer Fired (1993), by Wayne Allen Sallee
 David (1993), by Sean Doolittle
 Portrait of a Pulp Writer (1993), by F. A. McMahan
 Fish Harbor (1993), by Paul Pinn
 Ridi Bobo (1993), by Robert Devereaux 
 Adroitly Wrapped (1993), by Mark McLaughlin
 Thicker Than Water (1993), by Joel Lane
 Memento Mori (1993), by Scott Thomas
 The Blitz Spirit (1993), by Kim Newman
 Companions (1993), by Del Stone, Jr.
 Masquerade (1993), by Lillian Csernica
 Price of the Flames (1993), by Deidra Cox
 The Bone Garden (1993), by Conrad Williams
 Ice Cream and Tombstones (1993), by Nina Kiriki Hoffman
 Salt Snake (1993), by Simon Clark
 Lady’s Portrait, Executed in Archaic Colors (1993), by Charles M. Saplak
 Lost Alleys (1993), by Jeffrey Thomas
 Salustrade (1993), by D. F. Lewis
 The Power of One (1993), by Nancy Kilpatrick
 The Lions in the Desert (1993), by David Langford
 Turning Thirty (1993), by Lisa Tuttle
 Bloodletting (1993), by Kim Antieau
 Flying Into Naples (1993), by Nicholas Royle
 Under the Crust (1993), by Terry Lamsley

References

DAW Books website (and other sites)

Karl Edward Wagner
DAW Books books